GP Ciudad de Valladolid is a women's professional road bicycle racing event held annually in Valladolid, Spain.  It was first run in 2010 and serves as a race of the UCI Women's Road World Cup.

The 2012 race was cancelled for financial reasons.

Past winners

References

External links
 

UCI Women's Road World Cup
Women's road bicycle races
Sport in Valladolid
Cycle races in Spain
Recurring sporting events established in 2010
2010 establishments in Spain
Vall